Middleton may refer to:

People
Middleton (name), list of notable people with surname of Middleton

Places

Australia
Middleton, Queensland
Middleton, South Australia
Middleton, Tasmania, on the D'Entrecasteaux Channel
Middleton Beach, Western Australia
Middleton Reef, Tasman Sea

Canada
Middleton, Nova Scotia
Middleton, Ontario

Ireland
Midleton, County Cork

New Zealand 
 Middleton, New Zealand, a suburb of Christchurch
 Lake Middleton, a small lake in the South Island of New Zealand

South Africa
 Middleton, Eastern Cape, a hamlet

United Kingdom

England

Buckinghamshire
Middleton, Milton Keynes

County Durham
Middleton, Hartlepool
Middleton One Row
Middleton St George
Middleton-in-Teesdale

Cumbria
Middleton, Cumbria

Derbyshire
Middleton-by-Wirksworth
Middleton Incline, a former railway incline
Middleton railway station (Derbyshire)
Middleton-by-Youlgreave

Dorset
Middleton, Dorset

Essex
Middleton, Essex

Hampshire
Middleton, Hampshire

Herefordshire
Middleton, Herefordshire

Isle of Wight
Middleton, Isle of Wight

Lancashire
Middleton, Greater Manchester
Middleton (UK Parliament constituency) 1885–1918
Middleton, Lancashire

Norfolk
Middleton, Norfolk
Middleton Towers, a country house at Middleton, Norfolk
Middleton Towers railway station, a former station at Middleton, Norfolk

Northamptonshire
Middleton, Northamptonshire
Middleton Cheney

Northumberland
Middleton, Northumberland (near Belford)
Middleton, Wallington Demesne (near Cambo), a U.K. location

Oxfordshire
Middleton Stoney

Shropshire 
Middleton (near Chirbury)
Middleton, Bitterley, near Ludlow
Middleton, Oswestry, a U.K. location
Middleton Baggot
Middleton Priors
Middleton Scriven

Staffordshire
Middleton Green

Suffolk
Middleton, Suffolk

Sussex
Middleton-on-Sea, West Sussex
Middleton (electoral division), a West Sussex County Council constituency

Warwickshire
Middleton, Warwickshire

Yorkshire
Middleton, Craven
Middleton, Harrogate
Middleton, Leeds
Middleton, Ryedale
Middleton-on-Leven
Middleton on the Wolds
Middleton Quernhow
Middleton Tyas

Scotland
Middleton, Angus, a U.K. location
Middleton, Argyll and Bute, a U.K. location
Middleton, Midlothian, a U.K. location

Wales
National Botanic Garden of Wales, also known as Middleton.
Middleton, Swansea, a small village on the Gower peninsula

United States
Middleton, former name of Middletown, California
Middleton, Colorado
Middleton, Idaho
Middleton, Kentucky
Middleton, Massachusetts
Middleton, Michigan
Middleton, Mississippi
Middleton, New Hampshire
Middleton, New York (part of Long Island City in Newton Township, Queens)
Middleton, Oregon
Middleton, Tennessee
Middleton, Wisconsin, a city
Middleton (town), Wisconsin, a town
Middleton Junction, Wisconsin, an unincorporated community
West Middleton, Wisconsin, an unincorporated community
Middleton Place, historic plantation in Dorchester County, South Carolina
Middleton Tract, California

Fictional places
 Middleton, a setting in the DC Comics Martian Manhunter comic book series
 Middleton, the hometown of Kim Possible
 Middleton, the hometown of Buster Landru "Rant" Casey in Chuck Palahniuk's novel Rant
 Middleton, a setting in the Hallmark Channel series Good Witch

Other uses
 Middleton (horse), a racehorse
 HMS Middleton, name of a Royal Navy destroyer and a minesweeper
 HMT Lord Middleton (FY219), a Second World War Royal Navy trawler
 RFA Robert Middleton (A241), a Dundas class coastal stores carrier of the Royal Fleet Auxiliary
 Middleton Railway, West Yorkshire
 At Middleton, 2013 romance film directed by Adam Rodgers
 Clan Middleton, Scottish clan

See also
 Myddleton
 Myddelton
Middleton Hall (disambiguation)
Middletown (disambiguation)
North Middleton (disambiguation)
South Middleton (disambiguation)
West Middleton, Indiana
The Middletons, a comic strip